Fernando Cosciuc (born 19 February 1998) is an Argentine professional footballer who plays as a centre-back for Huracán.

Career
Cosciuc first appeared in the first-team of Huracán in 2017, being an unused substitute on 23 April during a draw against Estudiantes in the Argentine Primera División. On 28 May, Cosciuc made his professional debut after playing eighty minutes in a 1–1 home draw with Boca Juniors on 27 May.

In October 2021, Cosciuc suffered an anterior cruciate ligament injury, which would keep him out for at least six months. On 9 June 2022, Cosciuc joined Primera Nacional side Deportivo Maipú on a deal until the end of 2024.

Career statistics
.

References

External links

1998 births
Living people
Footballers from Rosario, Santa Fe
Argentine footballers
Argentine people of Romanian descent
Association football defenders
Argentine Primera División players
Club Atlético Huracán footballers
Club Atlético Brown footballers
San Martín de San Juan footballers
Deportivo Maipú players